Telling Tales is a 2015 Turkish comedy film directed by Burak Aksak.

Cast 
 Hande Doğandemir - Ayperi
 Fatih Artman - Riza
 Devrim Yakut - Selma
 Erdal Tosun - Cemal
  - Timur
 Gürkan Uygun - Jilet Ali
 Cengiz Bozkurt - Nafi
 Burcu Biricik - Ezgi
 Çağlar Ertuğrul - Erdil

References

External links 

2015 comedy films
Turkish comedy films
Films with live action and animation
2010s Turkish-language films